Alpelisib, sold under the brand name Piqray among others, is a medication used to treat certain types of breast cancer. It is used together with fulvestrant. It is taken by mouth. It is marketed by Novartis.

Common side effects include high blood sugar, kidney problems, diarrhea, rash, low blood cells, liver problems, pancreatitis, vomiting, and hair loss. It is an alpha-specific PI3K inhibitor. It was approved for medical use in the United States in May 2019.

Medical uses 
Alpelisib is indicated in combination with fulvestrant for the treatment of postmenopausal women, and men, with hormone receptor (HR)-positive, human epidermal growth factor receptor 2 (HER2)-negative, PIK3CA-mutated, advanced or metastatic breast cancer as detected by an FDA-approved test following progression on or after an endocrine-based regimen. 

In the European Union, alpelisib is indicated in combination with fulvestrant for the treatment of postmenopausal women, and men, with hormone receptor (HR)‑positive, human epidermal growth factor receptor 2 (HER2)‑negative, locally advanced or metastatic breast cancer with a PIK3CA mutation after disease progression following endocrine therapy as monotherapy.

In April 2022, the indication for alpelisib was expanded in the US to include the treatment of severe manifestations of PIK3CA-related overgrowth spectrum (PROS) in those who require systemic therapy.

History
In May 2019, alpelisib was approved in the United States for use in combination with the endocrine therapy fulvestrant, to treat postmenopausal women, and men, with hormone receptor (HR)-positive, human epidermal growth factor receptor 2 (HER2)-negative, PIK3CA-mutated, advanced or metastatic breast cancer following progression on or after an endocrine-based regimen.

The U.S. Food and Drug Administration (FDA) also approved the companion diagnostic test, therascreen PIK3CA RGQ PCR Kit, to detect the PIK3CA mutation in a tissue and/or a liquid biopsy.

The efficacy of alpelisib was studied in the SOLAR-1 trial (NCT02437318), a randomized trial of 572 postmenopausal women and men with HR-positive, HER2-negative, advanced or metastatic breast cancer whose cancer had progressed while on or after receiving an aromatase inhibitor.

The FDA granted the application for alpelisib priority review designation and granted approval of Piqray to Novartis. The FDA granted approval of the therascreen PIK3CA RGQ PCR Kit to Qiagen Manchester, Ltd.

On 28 May 2020, the Committee for Medicinal Products for Human Use (CHMP) of the European Medicines Agency (EMA) adopted a positive opinion, recommending the granting of a marketing authorization for the medicinal product alpelisib (Piqray), intended for the treatment of locally advanced or metastatic breast cancer with a PIK3CA mutation. The applicant for this medicinal product is Novartis Europharm Limited. Alpelisib was approved for medical use in the European Union in July 2020.

Society and culture

Legal status 
Alpelisib was approved for medical use in the United States in May 2019, in Australia in March 2020, and in the European Union in July 2020.

References

External links 
 
 

Amides
Novartis brands
Phosphoinositide 3-kinase inhibitors
Pyridines
Pyrrolidines
Thiazoles
Trifluoromethyl compounds
Ureas